Hugh St. Quentin Cayley (November 19, 1857 – April 13, 1934) was a Canadian lawyer, news reporter and politician.

Early life
Hugh St. Quentin Cayley was born on November 19, 1857 in Toronto. He was raised in Upper Canada and one of eleven children fathered by William Cayley. William Cayley was a lawyer and member of the Legislative Assembly of Canada.

Cayley studied law at the University of Toronto. After he graduated he worked for the law firm of Black, Kerr, Las and Cassels. Cayley later moved to New York City and became a news reporter.

Cayley married his wife Leonora Adelaide Cochrane on September 6, 1897.

They had one son, Beverley Cochrane Cayley, who was born October 25, 1898 and died from tuberculosis in June, 1928.

News career
Cayley's first job as a news reporter was at the New York Herald-Tribune. He later moved west settling in Calgary, Northwest Territories in 1884. He joined the staff at the Calgary Herald which was founded a year earlier. He quickly rose to be a partner in ownership of the Herald.

The biggest story of his career was the Travis Affair. In the fall of 1885 Stipendiary Magistrate Jeremiah Travis was sent by the federal government to enforce prohibition in Calgary. Travis took on the popular municipal council, and sentenced Alderman Simon J. Clarke to hard six months hard labour. Cayley, both clerk of the district court as well as editor of the Calgary Herald, wrote an unfavourable editorial on the magistrate. Travis accused Cayley of showing up at court drunk, dismissed him as clerk, charged him with contempt, and sentenced him to prison.

The height of Cayley's career at the Herald was serving as Publisher. He served that role from February 1885 to January 2, 1887.

He left the Herald selling off his interests in the newspaper when he ran for election in 1886.

Northwest Territories Legislature
Cayley was elected to the Northwest Territories Legislature in a by-election held on July 14, 1886. The election was held to elect two members from the Calgary electoral district. Cayley won the second seat with 28.5% of the popular vote. John D. Lauder finished first winning 33.6% of the popular vote in the four man field of candidates.

He was re-elected to a second term in the first Northwest Territories general election held in 1888. He won second place out of three with 34% of the vote. Cayley was acclaimed to his third term in the 1891 Northwest Territories general election.

Late life
After leaving politics, Cayley resumed his career as a lawyer. He was later appointed as Judge of County Court in Vancouver, British Columbia spending almost 20 years in that position. The town of Cayley, Alberta is named in his honor. He died on April 13, 1934 in Vancouver, British Columbia.

References

1857 births
1934 deaths
Members of the Legislative Assembly of the Northwest Territories
University of Toronto alumni
New-York Tribune personnel
Hugh